The euro came into existence on 1 January 1999, although it had been a goal of the European Union (EU) and its predecessors since the 1960s. After tough negotiations, the Maastricht Treaty entered into force in 1993 with the goal of creating an economic and monetary union by 1999 for all EU states except the UK and Denmark (even though Denmark has a fixed exchange rate policy with the euro).

The currency was formed virtually in 1999; notes and coins began to circulate in 2002. It rapidly took over from the former national currencies and slowly expanded behind the rest of the EU. In 2009, the Lisbon Treaty finalised its political authority, the Eurogroup, alongside the European Central Bank.

Development

Early ideas

The first ideas of an economic and monetary union in Europe were raised well before establishing the European Communities. For example, as earlier on as the League of Nations, Gustav Stresemann had enquired in 1929 for a European currency against the background of an increased economic division due to a number of new nation states in Europe after World War I. At this time memories of the Latin Monetary Union involving principally France, Italy, Belgium and Switzerland and which, for practical purposes, had disintegrated following the First World War, figured prominently in the minds of policy makers.

A first attempt to create an economic and monetary union between the members of the European Economic Community (EEC) arrived with an initiative by the European Commission in 1969, which set out the need for "greater co-ordination of economic policies and monetary cooperation". This was followed up at a meeting of the European Council at The Hague in December 1969. The European Council tasked Pierre Werner, Prime Minister of Luxembourg, with finding a way to reduce currency exchange rate volatility. His report was published in October 1970 and recommended centralisation of the national macroeconomic policies entailing "the total and irreversible fixing of parity rates and the complete liberation of movements of capital". But he did not propose a single currency or central bank. An attempt to limit the fluctuations of European currencies, using a snake in the tunnel, failed.

In 1971, US President Richard Nixon removed the gold backing from the US dollar, causing a collapse in the Bretton Woods system that managed to affect all of the world's major currencies. The widespread currency floats and devaluations set back aspirations for European monetary union. However, in March 1979 the European Monetary System (EMS) was created, fixing exchange rates onto the European Currency Unit (ECU), an accounting currency, to stabilise exchange rates and counter inflation. It also created the European Monetary Cooperation Fund (EMCF).

In February 1986, the Single European Act formalised political co-operation within the EEC, including competency in monetary policy. The European Council summit in Hannover on 14 June 1988 began to outline monetary co-operation. France, Italy and the European Commission backed a fully monetary union with a central bank, which British Prime Minister Margaret Thatcher opposed.

Relaunch

The Hannover European Council asked Commission President Jacques Delors to chair an ad hoc committee of central bank governors to propose a new timetable with clear, practical and realistic steps for creating an economic and monetary union. This way of working was derived from the Spaak method.

France and the UK were opposed to German reunification, and attempted to influence the Soviet Union to stop it. However, in late 1989 France extracted German commitment to the Monetary Union in return for support for German reunification.

The Delors report of 1989 set out a plan to introduce the EMU in three stages and it included the creation of institutions such as the European System of Central Banks (ESCB), which would become responsible for formulating and implementing monetary policy. It laid out monetary union being accomplished in three steps. Beginning the first of these steps, on 1 July 1990, exchange controls were abolished, thus capital movements were completely liberalised in the European Economic Community. Leaders reached agreement on currency union with the Maastricht Treaty, signed on 7 February 1992. It agreed to create a single currency, although without the participation of the United Kingdom, by January 1999.

Gaining approval for the treaty was a challenge. Germany was cautious about giving up its stable currency, i.e., the German Mark, France approved the treaty by a narrow margin and Denmark refused to ratify until they got such an opt-out from monetary union as the United Kingdom, an opt-out that they maintain as of 2019. On 16 September 1992, known in the UK as Black Wednesday, the British pound sterling was forced to withdraw from the fixed exchange rate system due to a rapid fall in the value of the pound.

Second stage

Delors' second stage began in 1994 with creation of the European Monetary Institute, succeeding the EMCF, under Maastricht. It was created as the forerunner to the European Central Bank. It met for the first time on 12 January under its first president, Alexandre Lamfalussy. After much disagreement, in December 1995 the name euro was adopted for the new currency (replacing the name Ecu used for the previous accounting currency), on the suggestion of then-German finance minister Theo Waigel. They also agreed on the date 1 January 1999 for its launch.

On 17 June 1997 the European Council decided in Amsterdam to adopt the Stability and Growth Pact, designed to ensure budgetary discipline after creation of the euro, and a new exchange rate mechanism (ERM II) was set up to provide stability above the euro and the national currencies of countries that hadn't yet entered the eurozone. Then, on 3 May 1998, at the European Council in Brussels, the 11 initial countries that would participate in the third stage from 1 January 1999 were selected. To participate in the new currency, member states had to meet strict criteria such as a budget deficit of less than 3% of their GDP, a debt ratio of less than 60% of GDP, low inflation, and interest rates close to the EU average. Greece failed to meet the criteria and was excluded from participating on 1 January 1999.

On 1 June 1998 the European Central Bank succeeded the European Monetary Institute. However, it did not take on its full powers until the euro was created on 1 January 1999. The bank's first President was Wim Duisenberg, former head of the EMI and the Dutch central bank. The conversion rates between the 11 participating national currencies and the euro were then established. The rates were determined by the Council of the European Union, based on a recommendation from the European Commission based on the market rates on 31 December 1998, so that one ECU would equal one euro. These rates were set by Council Regulation 2866/98 (EC), of 31 December 1998. They could not be set earlier, because the ECU depended on the closing exchange rate of the non-euro currencies (principally the pound sterling) that day. Due to differences in national conventions for rounding and significant digits, all conversion between the national currencies had to be carried out using the process of triangulation via the euro.

Creation

Launch

The currency was introduced in non-physical form (traveller's cheques, electronic transfers, banking, etc.) at midnight on 1 January 1999, when the national currencies of participating countries (the eurozone) ceased to exist independently in that their exchange rates were locked at fixed rates against each other, effectively making them mere non-decimal subdivisions of the euro. The euro thus became the successor to the European Currency Unit (ECU). The notes and coins for the old currencies, however, continued to be used as legal tender until new notes and coins were introduced on 1 January 2002 (having been distributed in small amounts in the previous December). Beginning on 1 January 1999, all bonds and other forms of government debt by eurozone nations were denominated in euros.

The value of the euro, which started at US$1.1686 on 31 December 1998, rose during its first day of trading, Monday, 4 January 1999, closing at approximately US$1.18. It was rapidly taken up and dealers were surprised by the speed at which it replaced the national currencies. Trading in the Deutsche Mark was expected to continue in parallel but vanished as soon as the markets opened. However, by the end of 1999 the euro had dropped to parity with the dollar leading to emergency action from the G7 to support the euro in 2001.

Later in 2000, Denmark held a referendum on whether to abandon their opt-out from the euro. The referendum resulted in a decision to retain the krone, and also set back plans for a referendum in the UK as a result. The procedure used to fix the irrevocable conversion rate of 340.750 between the Greek drachma and the euro was different, since the euro by then was already two years old. While the conversion rates for the initial eleven currencies were determined only hours before the euro was introduced as a virtual currency, the conversion rate for the Greek drachma was fixed several months beforehand, in Council Regulation 1478/2000 (EC) of 19 June 2000.

Minting
The designs for the new coins and notes were announced between 1996 and 1998, and production began at the various mints and printers on 11 May 1998. The task was large, and would require the full three-and-a-half-years. In all, 7.4 billion notes and 38.2 billion coins would be available for issuance to consumers and businesses on 1 January 2002. In seven nations, the new coins—struck in the run-up to 1 January 2002—would bear a 2002 date. In Belgium, Finland, France, the Netherlands, and Spain, the new coins would bear the date of striking, so those five countries would be the only ones to strike euro coins dated 1999, 2000, and 2001. Small numbers of coins from Monaco, Vatican City, and San Marino were also struck. These immediately became popular collector's items, commanding premiums well above face value. New issues continue to do so to this day.

Meanwhile, a parallel task was to educate the European public about the new coins. Posters were issued showing the designs, which were used on items ranging from playing cards to T-shirts. As a final step, on 15 December 2001, banks began exchanging "euro starter kits", plastic pouches with a selection of the new coins in each country (generally, between 10 and 20 euros' worth—though Finland's contained one of each coin, totalling €3.88). They would not be usable in commerce until 1 January, when notes would be made available as well. Larger starter kits, containing a roll of each denomination, were available as well in some nations.

Retailers and government agencies had a considerable task as well. For items to be sold to the public, dual pricing was commonly utilised. Postage stamps for governments (as well as stamps issued by the United Nations Postal Administration for the UN offices in Vienna) often bore denominations both in the legacy currency and euros, assuring continued utility beyond 2001. Banks bore a huge task, not only in preparation for the change of the notes and coins, but also in the back office. Beginning in 1999, all deposits and loans were technically in euros, but deposits and withdrawals continued in the legacy currency. Statements would bear balances in both currencies beginning no later than 1 July 2001, and earlier if required by the customer's needs.

Beginning on 1 December 2001, coins and notes were distributed from secure storage, first to large retailers, and then to smaller ones. It was widely expected that there would be massive problems on and after 1 January. Such a changeover, across twelve populous countries, had never been attempted before.

Currency transition

The new coins and notes were first valid on the French island of Réunion in the Indian Ocean. The first official purchase using euro coins and notes took place there, for one kilogram of lychees. The coming of midnight in Frankfurt at the ECB offices, though, symbolised the transition.

In Finland, the Central Bank opened for an hour at midnight to allow citizens to exchange currency, while a huge euro pyramid decorated Syntagma Square in Athens. Other countries noted the coming of the euro as well—Paris's Pont Neuf was decorated in EU colours, while in the northern German town of Gifhorn a sombre, symbolic funeral for the Deutsche Mark took place.

Except for Germany, the plan for introduction of the new currency was basically the same. Banks would accept the exchange of legacy currencies, begin to dispense euros from ATMs, and only euros would be available as withdrawals were made, beginning on 1 January. Merchants would accept legacy currency, but give change only in euros. In Germany, the Deutsche Mark would no longer be a legal tender on 1 January, but would have to be exchanged at the banks.

Despite the massive amounts of euros available, chaos was feared. In France, these fears were accentuated by a threatened postal workers' strike. The strike, however, was settled. Similarly, workers at the French bank BNP Paribas threatened to disrupt the introduction of euro currency with a strike. That was also settled.

In practice, the roll-out was smooth, with few problems. By 2 January, all ATMs in 7 countries and at least 90 percent in 4 others were issuing euros rather than legacy currency, with Italy, the worst offender, having only 85% of ATMs dispensing euros. The unexpected tendency of consumers to spend their legacy currency, rather than exchange it at banks, led to temporary shortages of euro small change, with some consumers being given change in legacy currency.

Some businesses did take advantage of the currency exchange to raise prices. According to a study by the Deutsche Bundesbank, there was a price rise, but consumers refused to buy as much. A coffee bar in Italy that took advantage of the transition to raise coffee prices by a third was ordered to pay compensation to customers.

Aftermath
Nations were allowed to keep legacy currency in circulation as legal tender for two months, until 28 February 2002. The official date on which the national currencies ceased to be legal tender varied from member state to member state. The earliest date was in Germany; the Deutsche Mark officially ceased to be legal tender after 31 December 2001. Most member states, though, permitted their legacy currency to remain in circulation the full two months. The legacy currency was exchangeable at commercial banks in the currency's nation for a further period, generally until 30 June 2002.

However, even after the official dates, they continued to be accepted for exchange by national central banks for varying periods—and indefinitely in Austria, Germany, Ireland, and Spain. Coins from those four countries, Italy, and Finland remain exchangeable. The earliest coins to become non-convertible were the Portuguese escudos, which ceased to have monetary value after 31 December 2002, although banknotes remain exchangeable until 2022. All banknotes current on 1 January 2002 would remain valid until at least 2012.

In Germany, Deutsche Telekom modified 50,000 pay phones to take Deutsche Mark coins in 2005, at least on a temporary basis. Callers were allowed to use DM coins, at least initially, with the Deutsche Mark pegged to equal one euro, almost twice the usual rate.

In France, as of 2007 receipts still indicated the value of products in the legacy currency (francs) along with the euro value. In other eurozone countries this had long been considered unnecessary. As of 2008, some small-town merchants in France still accepted franc notes.

Early growth

After dropping to an interday low of US$0.8296 on 26 October 2001, and a brief crash to $0.8115 on 15 January 2002, the euro soon recovered from its early slump. Its value last closed below $1.00 on 6 November 2002 ($0.9971), and increased rapidly from there. It peaked at $1.35 in 2004, and reached its highest value versus the US dollar at $1.5916 on 14 July 2008. As its values increased against the pound sterling in the late-2000s, peaking at 97.73p on 31 December 2008, its international usage grew rapidly. The euro grew in importance steadily, with its share of foreign exchange reserves rising from nearly 18% in 1999 to 25% in 2003—while the dollar share fell by an equivalent margin. Alan Greenspan in 2007 said the eurozone had profited from the euro's rise and claimed it was perfectly conceivable that it could trade equally or become more important than the US dollar in the future.

Public support
Public support for the euro in each state between 2001 and 2006.

Recession era

As a result of the global financial crisis that began in 2007/2008, the eurozone entered its first official recession in the third quarter of 2008, official figures confirmed in January 2009. The EU was in negative growth for the second, third and fourth quarters of 2008 and the first quarter of 2009 before returning to positive growth (for the eurozone as a whole). Despite the recession, Estonia acceded to the eurozone and Iceland put in an EU application to join the euro, seeing it at the time as a safe haven.

Lisbon Treaty
In 2009, the Lisbon Treaty formalised the Eurogroup, the meeting of euro finance ministers, with an official president. Jean-Claude Juncker served as president before and after formalisation and has been an advocate of strengthening the group, economic co-operation and common representation. Appetite for stronger economic co-operation grew due to the recession and the potential failure of some weaker eurozone members. However, Germany had opposed previous moves to strengthen the Eurogroup, such as French President Nicolas Sarkozy's attempts at Eurogroup summits, due to fears of undermining the ECB's independence. Jean-Claude Trichet, who succeeded Duisenberg as ECB president in 2003, fended off numerous attacks from Sarkozy at the start of the recession. Before that formalisation of the Eurogroup, eurozone leaders held an extraordinary summit in reaction to the financial crisis on 11 October 2008 in Paris. Rather than the Eurogroup meeting as finance ministers, they met as head of states or government (similar to the European Council) to define a joint action plan for the eurozone and the European Central Bank to stabilise the European economy. These such meetings would be where many euro governance reforms would be agreed.

Early responses
The leaders hammered out a plan to confront the financial crisis which will involve hundreds of billions of euros of new initiatives to head off a feared meltdown. They agreed a bank rescue plan: governments would buy into banks to boost their finances and guarantee interbank lending. Coordination against the crisis is considered vital to prevent the actions of one country harming another and exacerbating the bank solvency and credit shortage problems.

Despite initial fears by speculators in early 2009 that the stress of such a large recession could lead to the break-up of the eurozone, the euro's position actually strengthened as the year progressed. Far from the poorer performing economies moving further away and becoming a default risk, bond yield spreads between Germany and the weakest economies decreased easing the strain on these economies. Much of the credit for the turn around in fortunes has been attributed to the ECB, which injected €500bn into the banks in June. Indeed, the euro came to be seen as a safe haven, as countries outside it such as Iceland fared worse than those with the euro. Iceland subsequently applied to the EU to get the benefit of using a larger currency with the support of the ECB.

Bailout funds
However, with the risk of a default in Greece and other members in late 2009–10, eurozone leaders agreed to provisions for bailing out member states who could not raise funds (triggered for Greece in April 2010). This was a U-turn on the EU treaties, which rule out any bailout of a euro member in order to encourage members to manage their finances better. Yet with Greece struggling to restore its finances, other member states also at risk and the repercussions this would have on the rest of the eurozone economy; a temporary bail out mechanism was agreed and devised in the form of a special-purpose vehicle (SPV) named "European Financial Stability Facility" (complemented by the European Financial Stabilisation Mechanism and funds form the International Monetary Fund), aiming at preserving financial stability in Europe by providing financial assistance to eurozone states in difficulty. The crisis also spurred consensus for further economic integration and a range of proposals such as a "European Monetary Fund" or federal treasury.

However, in June 2010, broad agreement was finally reached on a controversial proposal for member states to peer review each other's budgets prior to their presentation to national parliaments. Although showing the entire budget to each other was opposed by Germany, Sweden and the UK, each government would present to their peers and the Commission their estimates for growth, inflation, revenue and expenditure levels six months before they go to national parliaments. If a country was to run a deficit, they would have to justify it to the rest of the EU while countries with a debt more than 60% of GDP would face greater scrutiny. The plans would apply to all EU members, not just the eurozone, and have to be approved by EU leaders along with proposals for states to face sanctions before they reach the 3% limit in the Stability and Growth Pact. Poland has criticised the idea of withholding regional funding for those who break the deficit limits, as that would only impact the poorer states. In June 2010 France agreed to back Germany's plan for suspending the voting rights of members who breach the rules.

In late 2010/early 2011, it was agreed to replace the European Financial Stability Facility and European Financial Stability Mechanism with a larger and permanent European Stability Mechanism (ESM). The ESM required a treaty amendment to allow it and a separate treaty to establish it but, if ratified successfully, would be established in time to take over when the old facilities expire in 2013. Meanwhile, to support Italy and prevent it having to ask for a bail-out later, the ECB controversially started buying Italian bonds, as it had done with Greece.

Fiscal agreements
In March 2011 was initiated a new reform of the Stability and Growth Pact aiming at straightening the rules by adopting an automatic procedure for imposing of penalties in case of breaches of either the deficit or the debt rules. The Euro Plus Pact sets out a wide range of reforms to take place in the eurozone to ensure and the French and German governments further agreed to push for a 'true economic government' that would involve twice-yearly eurozone leader summits and a financial transactions tax.

The European Fiscal Union is a proposal for a treaty about fiscal integration described in a decision adopted on 9 December 2011 by the European Council. The participants are the eurozone member states and all other EU members without the United Kingdom and the Czech Republic. The treaty entered into force on 1 January 2013 for the 16 states which completed ratification prior of this date and on 1 April 2014 entered into force for all 25 signatories.

Enlargements 

Despite speculation that the crisis in Greece could spread and that the euro might fail, some newer EU states from the 2004 enlargement joined the currency during the recession. Slovenia, Malta and Cyprus all acceded within the first two years of the recession, closely followed by Slovakia in 2009. The three Baltic states of Estonia, Latvia and Lithuania joined in 2011, 2014 and 2015, respectively. Eight years later, Croatia joined the eurozone in 2023.

Slovenia
Slovenia was the first country to join the eurozone after the launch of the coins and banknotes. Participation in ERM II began on 28 June 2004 and on 11 July 2006 the Council of EU adopted a decision allowing Slovenia to join the euro area as from 1 January 2007. The euro replaced the Slovenian tolar on 1 January 2007. The exchange rate between the euro and tolar had been set on 11 July 2006 at 239.640 SIT, but unlike the previous launches, cash and non-cash transactions were introduced simultaneously.

Cyprus
Cyprus replaced the Cypriot pound with the euro on 1 January 2008.

A formal letter of application to join the eurozone was submitted on 13 February 2007. On 16 May 2007 the European Commission, backed by the European Central Bank, gave its go-ahead for the introduction in January 2008.

The campaign to inform the citizens of Cyprus about the euro officially began in Cypriot media on 9 March 2007. On 15 March 2007, the Cypriot House of Representatives passed the necessary laws for the introduction of the euro on 1 January 2008. The European Commissioner for Economic & Financial Affairs Joaquín Almunia, on 16 May 2007, recommended that Cyprus adopt the euro as scheduled, and the European Parliament concurred on 21 June 2007; the date was confirmed by the EU leaders. The final decision was taken by the EU finance ministers (Ecofin) on 10 July 2007 and the conversion rate was fixed at 0.585274 CYP. On 23 October 2007, the coin designs were officially published in the Official Journal of the European Union.

On 1 January 2008, the euro replaced the Cypriot pound as the official currency. The euro is only used in the government-controlled areas of the Republic, the Sovereign Base Areas of Akrotiri and Dhekelia (under UK jurisdiction, outside the EU) and in the United Nations Buffer Zone in Cyprus. The de facto Turkish Republic of Northern Cyprus continues to use the new Turkish lira as its primary currency and the euro as its secondary currency.

Malta

Malta replaced the Maltese lira with the euro on 1 January 2008. The aims were officially confirmed on 26 February 2007. On 16 May 2007, the Commissioner for Economic & Financial Affairs of the EU, Joaquín Almunia, recommended that Malta adopt the euro as scheduled, a decision later confirmed by the Council of Finance Ministers of 10 July 2007. On the same day, dual displaying became mandatory and the first Maltese euro coins were struck at Monnaie de Paris. The first Maltese euro coins were available for the public on 1 December 2007, as business starter packs worth €131 each started being available for small businesses to fill up their cash registers with sufficient amount of euro coins before the €-day (Jum €). Mini-kits each worth €11.65 were available for the general public on 10 December 2007. Maltese coins which were current at the time of the euro transition could be exchanged through 1 February 2010.

Maltese citizens could obtain euro information directly from their town or village between December 2007 and January 2008. From the Euro Centres (Ċentru l-ewro) which opened during the day. People trained specifically on matters related to the changeover to the euro were available to provide council at euro centres along with information materials.

In December 2007, as part of the euro changeover celebrations, streets of Valletta were covered with carpets depicting euro coins. Celebrations reached climax on New Year's Eve with a firework display near the Grand Harbour area, several other activities had to be moved indoors because of the stormy weather that struck the island on that night.

Slovakia

Slovakia adopted the euro on 1 January 2009. The koruna was part of ERM II from 28 November 2005, requiring that it trade within 15% of an agreed central rate; this rate was changed on 17 March 2007 and again on 28 May 2008. The rate of 30.126 SKK from May 2008 was finally confirmed on 8 July 2008.

To assist the process of conversion to the euro, on 1 April 2008, the National Bank of Slovakia (NBS) announced their plan for withdrawal of the Slovak koruna notes and coins. A few days later, on 5 April 2008, Slovakia officially applied to enter the eurozone. On 7 May 2008, the European Commission approved the application and asked member states to endorse the bid during the EU finance ministers' meeting in July 2008.

Slovakia fulfilled the euro convergence criteria. At 2.2%, Slovakia's twelve-month inflation was well below the 3.2% threshold. However, for March 2008 annual inflation was 3.6%. Fiscal deficit was 2.2% versus the reference value of 3.0%. Finally, the government debt ratio was 29.4% of GDP in 2007, well below the maximum ratio of 60.0%. Public opinion supported the switch, with 58% in favour and 35% opposed, but 65% worried about the inflationary impacts of the adoption. Three months after the adoption of the currency, 83 percent of Slovaks considered Slovakia's decision to adopt the euro to have been right.

Publicity for the transition from the koruna to the euro on 1 January 2009 included a "euromobile", with a professional actor driving around the countryside holding impromptu quiz shows about the euro. Winners received euro T-shirts, euro conversion calculators, and chocolate euro coins. Euro starter kits, available for 500 koruna, were a popular Christmas gift in 2008. The coins therein, however, were not valid as legal tender in the eurozone until 1 January 2009, with koruna exchanged through 17 January 2009, though redeemable at the central bank in Bratislava until a date to be determined. Anyone using Slovakian euro coins before 1 January could have been fined. Businesses using the transition to raise prices also were subject to penalty.

Baltic states 
In 2010, Estonia gained the support of the European Commission, European Central Bank and European Parliament for accession on 1 January 2011, with Estonia adopting the currency on that date and becoming the first nation from the former Soviet Union to do so. In 2013, Latvia gained the support of the European Commission, European Central Bank and European Parliament for accession on 1 January 2014, with Latvia adopting the currency on that date. On 23 July 2014 Lithuania became the last Baltic state to gain permission to join the euro, which was adopted on 1 January 2015.

Croatia 
Croatia completed its plans to adopt the Euro Currency as soon as possible after the July 1, 2013 EU accession. The country commenced participation in the ERM II on 10 July, 2020 and on 12 July, 2022 the Council of EU adopted a currency decision allowing Croatia to join the eurozone from the 1 January, 2023. The euro replaced the Croatian kuna on 1 January 2023. The exchange rate between the euro and kuna had been set on 12 July 2022 at 7.5345 HRK and similar to the previous launch of Slovenia, cash and non-cash transactions were introduced simultaneously on the same day and date the country also entered the Schengen Area.

Public opinion
Public support for the euro in each state from the start of the financial crisis in 2007 to Lithuania's accession in 2015

Overview of eurozone enlargements and exchange-rate regimes for EU members
The chart below provides a full summary of all applying exchange-rate regimes for EU members, since the European Monetary System with its Exchange Rate Mechanism and the related new common currency ECU was born on 13 March 1979. The euro replaced the ECU 1:1 at the exchange rate markets, on 1 January 1999. During 1979–1999, the D-Mark functioned as a de facto anchor for the ECU, meaning there was only a minor difference between pegging a currency against ECU and pegging it against the D-mark. 

The eurozone was born with its first 11 Member States on 1 January 1999. The first enlargement of the eurozone, to Greece, took place on 1 January 2001, one year before the euro had physically entered into circulation. The next enlargements were to states which joined the EU in 2004, and then joined the eurozone on 1 January in the mentioned year: Slovenia (2007), Cyprus (2008), Malta (2008), Slovakia (2009), Estonia (2011), Latvia (2014), Lithuania (2015), and Croatia (2023).

All new EU members having joined the bloc after the signing of the Maastricht Treaty in 1992, are obliged to adopt the euro under the terms of their accession treaties. However, the last of the five economic convergence criteria which needs first to be complied with in order to qualify for euro adoption, is the exchange rate stability criterion, which requires having been an ERM-member for a minimum of two years without the presence of "severe tensions" for the currency exchange rate.

In September 2011, a diplomatic source close to the euro adoption preparation talks between the seven remaining new Member States from Eastern Europe who had yet to adopt the euro (Bulgaria, Czech Republic, Hungary, Latvia, Lithuania, Poland and Romania), claimed that the monetary union (eurozone) they had thought they were going to join upon their signing of the accession treaty may very well end up being a very different union entailing much closer fiscal, economic and political convergence. This changed legal status of the eurozone could potentially cause them to conclude that the conditions for their promise to join were no longer valid, which "could force them to stage new referendums" on euro adoption.

Public support

See also

History of the European Communities (1973–1993)
History of the European Union (2004–present)
European Unit of Account
Gold parity unit of account

Notes

Further reading

 Pomfret, Richard (2021). The Road to Monetary Union. Cambridge University Press.

References

External links
EMU: A Historical Documentation (European Commission)
The Euro's Rise from the Dean Peter Krogh Foreign Affairs Digital Archives (archived 15 December 2012)
The euro (European Commission Economic and Financial Affairs)
What is the European Monetary Union? University of Iowa Center for International Finance and Development (archived 12 March 2010)
Economic and Monetary Union of the European Union on CVCE website

1999 in economics
Euro
Euro
Monetary policy of the European Union
Euro